The 1991 Andorran local elections were held on 15 and 22 December. Voters elected the council members of the seven parishes of Andorra. Following the election, the communal councils elected the mayors and deputy mayors.

Electoral system
Candidates were elected using a two-round plurality-at-large voting system with open lists. As parties were not legalised until 1993, all the lists were officially labelled as independent, although media classified them as government endorsed (if the list was supported by the outgoing government) or opposition (if candidates were part of the opposition). After the elections, the parish councils elected the consol major (mayor) and the cònsol menor (deputy mayor), which normally were the top candidates of the winning list.

In some parishes, votes may had been invalid if voters didn't choose for candidates from at every single quarter.

Candidates

Candidates by parish. Names shown are top candidates:
Canillo
Francesc Areny
Bonaventura Bonell
Andorra la Vella
Lluís Viu Torres
Andreu Armengol Pascuet
Sant Julià de Lòria
Ricard Tor Riba
Escaldes-Engordany
Jacint Casal Mor

Results
Turnout was 75.6%, 6.0 pp lower than in 1987. Candidates favourable to the Andorran Government won in 4 out of 7 parishes.

The second round only took place in Canillo.

Andorra la Vella

Sant Julià de Lòria

Escaldes Engordany

References

1991
Andorra
1991 in Andorra
December 1991 events in Europe